The Bombay Sisters, C. Saroja (born 7 December 1936) and C. Lalitha (26 August 1938 – 31 January 2023), were an Indian Carnatic music singing duo. They received the Padma Shri, India's fourth highest civilian honour, in 2020.

Early life
The Bombay Sisters, C. Saroja and C. Lalitha, were born in Trichur, in what is today Kerala, to Mukthambal and N. Chidambaram Iyer.  The sisters were brought up in Bombay. Saroja and Lalitha had their education in the S.I.E.S Matunga, passed their intermediate privately from Bhopal, M.P. and completed their graduation from Delhi University. They had their musical training with H. A. S. Mani, Musiri Subramania Iyer and T. K. Govinda Rao. T. K. Govinda Rao played major role in training the nuances of Carnatic music, How to enhance the raga and its bhava while singing sangatis in a kriti

Career 
After they were groomed in Carnatic music in Mumbai, the sisters moved to Chennai when the elder sister, Saroja, first received a fellowship at the Central College of Music in Madras (now Chennai). The younger sister, Lalitha, also later received a fellowship at the same college. The duo got their name when Mouna Swamigal of Ambattur addressed them as 'Bombay Sahodarigal' and the name stuck.

As part of the trend of duo singing in Carnatic music, which started in the 1950s, with performers like Radha Jayalakshmi, and Soolamangalam Sisters, Bombay Sisters began singing in 1963 when they started with light classical music, subsequently progressing to classical Carnatic music. Their first major concert in Madras was at the Sai Baba temple in Mylapore, where they were bumped to the prime-time slot because of the unavailability of Madurai Mani Iyer.

The duo sang in multiple languages including Sanskrit, Kannada, Telugu, Tamil, Malayalam, Hindi and Marathi. They stayed away from singing for film-songs through their career. They were also known for promoting young musicians through endowments and scholarships. They received the Padma Shri, India's fourth highest civilian honour, in 2020.

Awards

 Padmashri, 2020; awarded by the Government of India
 Isai Peraringar Award, 2006; awarded by the Tamil Isai Sangam
 Sangeetha Kalasikhamani, 2006; awarded by The Indian Fine Arts Society, Chennai
 Kalaimamani for contributions to Carnatic music; awarded by the Government of Tamilnadu
 First women to be conferred the status of Asthana Vidushi by the Kanchi matha
 Sangeetha Kalanidhi Award, 2010; awarded by the Madras Music Academy
 Sangeetha Choodamani Award, 1991; awarded by the Sri Krishna Gana Sabha
 Sangeet Natak Akademi Award, 2004; awarded by the Government of India
 S V Narayanaswamy Rao Award, 2018; awarded by the Sree Rama Seva Mandali, Bangalore
 Maharajapuram Viswanatha Iyer Memorial Award, 2013
 Sangeetha Kala Nipuna, 1994; awarded by Mylapore Fine Arts Club, Madras
 M S Subbulakshmi Award 2019; awarded by the Government of Tamilnadu

Personal life 
Lalitha was married to N. R. Chandran, former Advocate-General of Madras. She died on 31 January 2023, aged 84, in Chennai. She was suffering from cancer.

Saroja is married to Rajaram, former chief secretary of the Lalit Kala Akademi.

Discography
Source(s):

Sanskrit 

 Sri Venkatesa Suprabhatham & Sri Vishnu Sahasranamam
 Sri Parthasarathy Suprabhatham & Pasurangal
 Sri Kamakshi Suprabhatham (2018)
 Sri Raghavendra Suprabhatham & Sthothras
 Sri Mookambika Suprabhatham
 Sri Sharada Suprabhatham & Other Sthothras
 Sri Bhubaneswari Suprabhatham & Songs
 Sri Kalikambal Suprabhatham
 Siva Suprabhatham & Sthothras
 Sri Lakshmi Hayagreeva Stotram 
 Sri Lakshmi Narasimha Stotram (1991)
 Sri Lakshmi Sahasranamam
 Mooka Panchasathi Vol 01,Vol 02, Vol 03, Vol 04
 Gangalahari
 Sri Bilva Ashtothara Sathanamavali
 Devi Mahathmayam Vol 01,Vol 02, Vol 03
 Sowdaryalahari
 Sri Lalitha Sahasranamam & Ashtothram
 Durga Sthothram
 Sree Mahishasuramardini Sthothram
 Sriman Narayaneeyam
 Sthothravali
 Sthothramala
 Sri Hanuman Chalisa & Other Hanumath Stothras (2008)
 Chinna Chinna Slogangal
 Krishna Karnamrutham
 Sivanandalahari
 Sri Vishnu Padadi Kesantha Sthothram
 AanandaLahari
 Dakshinamurthy Sthothram
 Adi Sankara SivasthuthiMala
 Aadithya Hridayam
 SriSthuthi Bhoosthuthi
 Padmanabha Sathakam
 Subrahmanyam (Kandarkalivemba)
 Sri Lalitha Trisathi and Other Devi Stothras
 Devi Sthothra Malika
 Devi Sthothra Mala
 Mahishasura Mardhini (Nadam Music)
 Ramaya Thubhyam Namah
 Valmiki Ramayanam
 Sri Dattathreya Sthothram
 Sri Bhubaneswari Suprabhatham and Ashtakam
 Sri Pudukkottai Bhuvaneswari Suprabhatham and Songs

Malayalam 

 Sapthaham (1991)
 Sundara Narayana Guruvayurappan Gananjali Vol. 8- CD 1
 Sundara Narayana Guruvayurappan Gananjali Vol. 8- CD 2

Tamil 

 Sri Guruvayurappa Suprabhatham
 Kandar Sashti Kavacham (Sangeetha Music)
 Daivegathenisai
 Ganapathi Aayiram Namangal
 Enn Annai
 Divyaprabadham
 Jaya Jaya Kali
 Kandar Sashti Kavacham (KRV Music)
 Karumari Amman Andhadi
 Koil Mani Osai
 Maagadu Amman Aaruvara Padalgal
 Maduraimeenakshi
 Mahishasuramardhini (Symphony music)
 Narayana Leelanjali
 Navagraha Krithis
 Pallikkarannai Parasakthi
 PoornayogaVibhavam
 Ramanar Suprabhatham
 Sai Bhajan
 Sakthiye Sakthi
 Saravana Sangeetham
 Shanmukha Suprabhatham
 Kudavarasi Amman Padalgal
 Sivadarisanam
 Sri Bhuvaneswari Kavacham
 Sri Hanumanchalisa & Songs
 Sri Panchamukha Herambha Ganapathi Kavacham (1993)
 Prasanna Venkatachalapathi pukazhmalai
 Raghavedra Songs
 Raghavendra Suprabhatham
 Raghavendra Navarathnamalai
 Sri Saneeswara Bhagavan Sthothram
 Sri Thiruchedur Suprabhatham
 Sri Venkatesa Suprabhatham (Tamil)
 Sri Lalitha Sahasranamam (Tamil)
 Sri Vishnu Sahasranamam (Tamil)
 Bhajagovindam & Mukundamala (1991)
 Aandal
 Vinayaka Agaval
 Thiruppugazh
 Sri Venkatesa Suprabhatham (symphony)
 Mahalakshmi Suprabhatham

Kannada 

 Devi Geethanjali (1991).
 Ambe Mookambe (1991).
 Kailasagirivasa Sri Manjunatha
 Navagraha Bhakthimala
 Srinivasa Vaibhava
 Varamahalakshmi
 Venkateswara Suprabhatham (Kannada)
 Gorahanahalli Mahalakshmi Suprabhatham

References

External links
 Profile at ChennaiOnline.com
 BombaySisters.com

Women Carnatic singers
Carnatic singers
Singers from Chennai
Singers from Thrissur
Indian musical duos
Sibling musical duos
Musical groups established in 1963
Musical groups disestablished in 2023
1963 establishments in India
2023 disestablishments in India
20th-century Indian singers
20th-century Indian women singers
21st-century Indian women singers
21st-century Indian singers
Women musicians from Maharashtra
Recipients of the Padma Shri in arts
Recipients of the Sangeet Natak Akademi Award